Henry Wale (14 July 1891 – 28 December 1969), known professionally as Henry Oscar, was an English stage and film actor. He changed his name and began acting in 1911, having studied under Elsie Fogerty at the Central School of Speech and Drama, then based in the Royal Albert Hall, London. He appeared in a wide range of films, including The Man Who Knew Too Much (1934), Fire Over England (1937), The Four Feathers (1939), Hatter's Castle (1942), Bonnie Prince Charlie (1948), Beau Brummell (1954), The Little Hut (1957), Beyond This Place (1959), Oscar Wilde (1960), Lawrence of Arabia (1962), The Long Ships (1963) and Murder Ahoy! (1964).

Selected filmography

 After Dark (1933) as Higgins
 Love, Life and Laughter (1934) (uncredited)
 Brides to Be (1934) as Laurie Randall
 Red Ensign (1934) as Raglan
 The Man Who Knew Too Much (1934) as George Barbor, Dentist (uncredited)
 The Case of Gabriel Perry (1935) as Gabriel Perry
 Night Mail (1935) as Mancini
 Me and Marlborough (1935) as Goultier
 The Tunnel (1935) as Grellier
 Father O'Flynn (1935) as Westmacott
 Sexton Blake and the Bearded Doctor (1935) as Dr. Gibbs
 Love in Exile (1936) as Dictator
 Seven Sinners (1936) as Axel Hoyt
 The Man Behind the Mask (1936) as Interpol Detective ("Voltaire")
 Spy of Napoleon (1936) as Hugo Blot
 Dishonour Bright (1936) as Blenkinsop
 No Escape (1936) as Cyril Anstey
 Sensation (1936) as Superintendent Stainer
 Fire Over England (1937) as Spanish Ambassador
 Dark Journey (1937) as Swedish Magistrate
 The Return of the Scarlet Pimpernel (1937) as Robespierre
 Who Killed John Savage? (1937) as Woolrich
 The Academy Decides (1937) as Kyle
 The Terror (1938) as Joe Connor
 Luck of the Navy (1938) as Commdr. Perrin
 Black Limelight (1939) as Inspector Tanner
 The Four Feathers (1939) as Dr. Harraz
 The Saint in London (1939) as Bruno Lang
 On the Night of the Fire (1939) as Pilleger
 Hell's Cargo (1939) as Liner captain
 Dead Man's Shoes (1940) as President of the Court
 Spies of the Air (1940) as Porter
 Tilly of Bloomsbury (1940) as Lucius Welwyn
 The Flying Squad (1940) as Sir Edward, Police Commissioner
 Two for Danger (1940) as Claude Frencham
 Atlantic Ferry (1941) as Josiah Eagles
 The Seventh Survivor (1942) as Goodenough
 Penn of Pennsylvania (1942) as Samuel Pepys
 Hatter's Castle (1942) as Grierson
 The Day Will Dawn (1942) as Newspaper Editor
 Squadron Leader X (1943) as Dr. Schultz
 The Upturned Glass (1947) as Coroner
 Mrs. Fitzherbert (1947) as William Pitt
 The Greed of William Hart (1948) as Moore
 The Idol of Paris (1948) as Lachman
 Bonnie Prince Charlie (1948) as King James II
 The Bad Lord Byron (1949) as Count Gamba
 The Man from Yesterday (1949) as Julius Rickman
 Prelude to Fame (1950) as Signor Mario Bondini
 The Black Rose (1950) as Friar Roger Bacon
 Martin Luther (1953)
 Knights of the Round Table (1953) as King Mark of Cornwall (uncredited)
 Diplomatic Passport (1954) as The Chief
 Beau Brummell (1954) as Dr. Willis
 It's a Great Day (1955) as Borough Surveyor
 Portrait of Alison (1955) as John Smith
 Private's Progress (1956) as Art Expert
 The Little Hut (1957) as Mr. Trollope
 The Spaniard's Curse (1958) as Fredericks
 The Secret Man (1958)
 The Adventures of William Tell as Dr Kein, "The Magic Powder" episode
 Beyond This Place (1959 film) : (Web of Evidence), US (1959) as Alderman Sharpe
 Oscar Wilde (1960) as Justice Wills
 The Brides of Dracula (1960) as Herr Lang
 Foxhole in Cairo (1960) as Col. Zeltinger
 Lawrence of Arabia (1962) as Silliam, Faisal's servant/Reciter (uncredited)
 The Long Ships (1964) as Auctioneer
 Murder Ahoy! (1964) as Lord Rudkin
 The City Under the Sea (1965) as Mumford

Selected stage credits
 Flowers of the Forest (1934) by John Van Druten
 The Assassin (1948) by Irwin Shaw 
 The Shop at Sly Corner (1945) by Edward Percy
 The Moonraker (1952) by Arthur Watkyn

References

External links
 

English male film actors
English male stage actors
Male actors from London
1891 births
1969 deaths
20th-century English male actors